Joanna is a genus of skipper butterflies in the family Hesperiidae.

Species
Recognised species in the genus Joanna include:
 Joanna joanna Evans, [1955]

References

Natural History Museum Lepidoptera genus database

Hesperiinae
Hesperiidae genera